The NRL Grand Final Breakfast is a breakfast function organised by the National Rugby League on the week of the NRL Grand Final. The breakfast marks the traditional beginning to Grand Final day and is one of the biggest social highlights on the Australian sporting calendar. Watching the event is a ritual for many footy fans and the function plays a huge role in the pre match build up for the Grand Final.

Venues

See also

 Champagne breakfast
 Index of breakfast-related articles
 List of dining events
 North Melbourne Grand Final Breakfast

References

External links
 

National Rugby League
Australian sports television series
Rugby league television shows
Breakfast
NRL Grand Finals
Dining events
Spring (season) events in Australia